Stano may refer to:

People

Surname
Angelo Stano (born 1953), Italian comic book artist
Gerald Stano (1951–1998), American serial killer
Jerome Stano (1932–2011), American senator of Ohio
Massimo Stano (born 1992), Italian racewalker
Marzia Stano, Italian singer
Pavol Staňo (born 1977), Slovak footballer
Tono Stano (born 1960), Slovak art photographer

Nickname
Stano (singer) (real name Stanislav Stavitsky; born 1981), Russian-Lithuanian singer
Stanislav Kropilák (born 1955), Czechoslovak-Slovak basketball player nicknamed Stano

Places
Stano, Kansas, United States

See also
Stanozolol, an anabolic steroid